The Cotswold-Severn Group are a series of long barrows erected in an area of western Britain during the Early Neolithic. Around 200 known examples of long barrows are known from the Cotswold-Severn region, although an unknown number of others were likely destroyed prior to being recorded.

Definition

The concept of the "Cotswold-Severn group" was coined by 1937 by the archaeologist Glyn Daniel. They represent a regional grouping of long barrows, a broader architectural tradition found across Atlantic Europe. This tradition stretches from southeast Spain up to southern Sweden, taking in the British Isles to the west. Overall, about 40,000 long barrows are known to survive from the Early Neolithic across Europe. The long barrows are not the world's oldest known structures using stone—they are predated by Göbekli Tepe in modern Turkey—but they do represent the oldest widespread tradition of using stone in construction. The archaeologist Frances Lynch has described them as "the oldest built structures in Europe" to survive. Although found across this large area, they can be subdivided into clear regionalised traditions based on architectural differences, of which the Cotswold-Severn Group is one.

The long barrow tradition originated somewhere in the area of modern Spain, Portugal, and western France; here, the long barrows were first erected in the mid-fifth millennium BCE. The tradition then spread north, along the Atlantic coast. It had reached Britain by the first half of the fourth millennium BCE, either soon after farming or in some cases perhaps just before it, and then moved into other parts of northern Europe, for instance arriving in the area of the modern Netherlands by the second half of the fourth millennium BCE.
On the basis of dates ascertained from a number of excavations, Darvill argued that long barrows appeared in the Cotswolds-Severn region fairly abruptly around 3700 BCE. They continued to be built for about 600 years. By 2600 BCE, very few of them had chambers that remained in active use and many had been deliberately blocked up.

Within the Cotswolds-Severn area, there are around 200 known long barrows. An unknown number have been destroyed before ever having been recorded; at least ten of those that had been recorded have since been destroyed or lost.
Over 140 long barrows are known within the Cotswolds area itself.
In northern Wiltshire and in the Dorset chalk hills, the Cotswold-Severn Group of long barrows overlap with the style of earthen barrow found largely across the east of the island.

Design

The choice of place in which the Cotswold-Severn long barrows were erected is unlikely to have been random.

Darvill noted that "when these sites were new, they were brutal and hard; bright white rocky mounds covering dark dank shadowy chambers."

Funerary deposits

The Cotswold-Severn Group long barrows usually contained human bone in large quantities, with said barrows averaging the remains of between 40 and 50 individuals each. In some cases, the individual corpses may have been placed into the chamber whole and then left to decay inside; in others, the body may have been dismembered or excarnated outside the barrow before the bones were then placed into the chamber. Usually, the bones of different individuals were jumbled up within the chambers of the tomb, perhaps reflecting a deliberate decision to symbolically merge the individual with the collective dead. In some cases, the bones were segregated into different chambers within the tomb according to age or sex. In most cases, such deposits of human bone were made successively, at various intervals. It is also apparent that in some cases, select bones appear to have been removed from the chambers, perhaps for use in ritualised practices.

When entering the chambers to either add or remove new material, individuals would likely have been exposed to the smell of decaying corpses. It is unknown if entering this area was therefore seen by Early Neolithic Europeans as an ordeal to be overcome or an honourable job to be selected for.

In a few instances, other items were deposited in the chambers with the human bone. Such deposits included pottery, worked flint, pebbles, stone discs, beads, bone pins, dog bones, and most prominently, cattle bone. The deposition of animal bone—especially the skulls of cattle and pigs—was also a common recurring factor in the forecourts of the Cotswold-Severn long barrows. The purpose of these is not known; they may have represented totemic animals, have been seen as protective deposits, or been the remains of feasts.

Meaning and purpose

While the purpose and meaning of these long barrows are not known, archaeologists have made suggestions on the basis of recurring patterns that can be observed within the tradition.
Many archaeologists have suggested that this is because Early Neolithic people adhered to an ancestor cult that venerated the spirits of the dead, believing that they could intercede with the forces of nature for the benefit of their living descendants. It has furthermore been suggested that Early Neolithic people entered into the tombs—which doubled as temples or shrines—to perform rituals that would honour the dead and ask for their assistance. For this reason, the historian Ronald Hutton termed these monuments "tomb-shrines" to reflect their dual purpose.

In Britain, these tombs were typically located on prominent hills and slopes overlooking the surrounding landscape, perhaps at the junction between different territories. The archaeologist Caroline Malone noted that the tombs would have served as one of a variety of markers in the landscape that conveyed information on "territory, political allegiance, ownership, and ancestors." Many archaeologists have subscribed to the idea that these tomb-shrines served as territorial markers between different tribal groups, although others have argued that such markers would be of little use to a nomadic herding society. Instead it has been suggested that they represent markers along herding pathways. Many archaeologists have suggested that the construction of such monuments reflects an attempt to stamp control and ownership over the land, thus representing a change in mindset brought about by the transition from the hunter-gatherer Mesolithic to the pastoralist Early Neolithic. Others have suggested that these monuments were built on sites already deemed sacred by Mesolithic hunter-gatherers.

Distribution
Tombs of this type are concentrated in the Cotswolds but extend as far as Gower and Avebury with some isolated examples in North Wales. Tombs of all three types are generally evenly distributed and it has been theorised that the design evolved over time. Severn-Cotswold tombs share certain features with the transepted gallery graves of the Loire and may have been inspired by these, with the lateral chambers and other differences being local variations.

In the 1960s and 1970s Dr John X. W. P. Corcoran and others argued that the group in fact consisted of three contemporary types, and later excavations have supported this.

Archaeological investigation

One of the first major studies of the subject was The Long Barrows of the Cotswolds, written by the archaeologist O. G. S. Crawford and published in 1925.

During the nineteenth and twentieth centuries, a number of sites in the Cotswold-Severn Group were subject to restoration efforts to turn them into visitor attractions.

List of sites

In the North Wessex Downs

In the Cotswold Hills

West of the Severn

References

Footnotes

Bibliography

Further reading
 
 
 
 
 Orientations of Neolithic Chambered Tombs in Glamorgan and Gwent, South Wales by Martin J. Powell

Tumuli in Wales
Stone Age Britain
Megalithic monuments
Tumuli in England